= Centurion Guard =

Computer security product

Centurion Guard is a PC hardware and software-based security product, developed by Centurion Technologies. It was first released in 1996. There were several different releases and versions of this product, and many were distributed in computers donated to libraries by the Bill & Melinda Gates Foundation.

== Operating system compatibility ==
- Microsoft Windows 7
- Microsoft Windows Vista
- Microsoft Windows XP
